Matteo Luccardi (born Piacenza, 21 January 1998) is an Italian rugby union player. His usual position is as a Hooker. He currently plays for Calvisano in Top12.

For the 2019–20 Pro14 season, he was named as Additional Player for Zebre in Pro 14.

In 2017 and 2018, Luccardi was named in the Italy Under 20 squad.

References

External links
It's Rugby France
Ultimate Rugby Profile

1998 births
Living people
Sportspeople from Piacenza
Italian rugby union players
Rugby union hookers
Rugby Calvisano players